Keo Nakama (May 21, 1920 – September 8, 2011) was an American swimmer.

Nakama was born in the town of Puʻunene, Hawaii, on the island of Maui. 
He was one of a group taught by Soichi Sakamoto at the Puʻunene School
His swimming career included a world record 20:29 in the mile swim, Big Ten Conference titles at Ohio State, and numerous national and international victories. The outbreak of World War II prevented his competing in an Olympic Games: Nakama was at his peak from 1940 to 1944. He was inducted into the International Swimming Hall of Fame in 1975.

Nakama is best known for swimming from the island of Molokai to Oahu in Hawaii, at 40 years of age. In September 1961, he crossed the dangerous 27-mile Ka Iwi Channel in 15 ½ hours; he was the first person to verifiably accomplish this feat.

Nakama was later elected to the Hawaii State House of Representatives, where he served for five terms until 1974.  He died in Honolulu at the age of 91.

See also
 List of members of the International Swimming Hall of Fame

References

External links

 Honolulu Star-Bulletin: "They don't make them like Keo no more"
 Honolulu Advertiser: "Nakama ruled in the pool, shined on the baseball diamond"
http://www.swimnews.com/news/view/8901

1920 births
2011 deaths
American athlete-politicians
American male swimmers
Hawaii politicians of Japanese descent
Members of the Hawaii House of Representatives
Ohio State Buckeyes baseball players 
American sportspeople of Japanese descent
Swimmers from Hawaii